National Route 504 is a national highway of Japan connecting between Kanoya, Kagoshima and Izumi, Kagoshima in Japan, with total length has .

See also

References

504
Roads in Kagoshima Prefecture